Ahmed bin Ahmed Ghaleb al-Mabaqi (born 1957) is a Yemeni economist who has been serving as governor of the Central Bank of Yemen since 6 December 2021.

Early life and education 
Ahmed al-Mabaqi was born 7 October 1957 in Mabaq, Lahj, Southern Yemen. He studied Economics and Financial Sciences at King Fahd University of Petroleum and Minerals and graduated 1983.

See also 
 Economy of Yemen
 Yemeni rial
 Central Bank of Yemen

References 

Yemeni economists
Governors of the Central Bank of Yemen
People from Lahj Governorate
1957 births
Living people